Sara Teasdale (August 8, 1884January 29, 1933) was an American lyric poet. She was born Sarah Trevor Teasdale in St. Louis, Missouri, and used the name Sara Teasdale Filsinger after her marriage in 1914.

In 1918 she won a Pulitzer Prize for her 1917 poetry collection Love Songs.

Biography

Sara Teasdale was born on August 8, 1884. She had poor health for much of her childhood, so she was home schooled until age 9. It was at age 10 that she was well enough to begin school. She started at Mary Institute in 1898, but switched to Hosmer Hall in 1899, graduating in 1903. The Teasdale family lived at 3668 Lindell Blvd. and then 38 Kingsbury Place in St. Louis, Missouri. Both homes were designed by Sara's mother. The house on Kingsbury Place had a private suite for Sara on the second floor. Guests entered through a separate entrance and were admitted by appointment. This suite is where Sara worked, slept, and often dined alone.

From 1904 to 1907, Teasdale was a member of The Potters, led by Lillie Rose Ernst, a group of female artists in their late teens and early twenties who published, from 1904 to 1907, The Potter's Wheel, a monthly artistic and literary magazine in St. Louis.

Teasdale's first poem was published in William Marion Reedy's Reedy's Mirror, a local newspaper, in 1907. Her first collection of poems, Sonnets to Duse and Other Poems, was published that same year.

Teasdale's second collection, Helen of Troy and Other Poems, was published in 1911. It was well received by critics, who praised its lyrical mastery and romantic subject matter.

From 1911 to 1914 Teasdale was courted by several men, including the poet Vachel Lindsay, who was truly in love with her but did not feel that he could provide enough money or stability to keep her satisfied. She chose to marry Ernst Filsinger, a longtime admirer of her poetry, on December 19, 1914.

Teasdale's third poetry collection, Rivers to the Sea, was published in 1915. It was and is a bestseller, being reprinted several times. In 1916 she and Filsinger moved to New York City, where they lived in an Upper West Side apartment on Central Park West.

In 1918 she won a Pulitzer Prize for her 1917 poetry collection Love Songs. It was "made possible by a special grant from The Poetry Society"; however, the sponsoring organization now lists it as the earliest Pulitzer Prize for Poetry (inaugurated 1922).

Filsinger's constant business travel caused Teasdale much loneliness. In 1929, she moved interstate for three months, thereby satisfying the criterion to gain a divorce. She did not wish to inform Filsinger, only doing so at her lawyers' insistence as the divorce was going through. Filsinger was shocked. After the divorce she moved only two blocks from her old home on Central Park West. She rekindled her friendship with Vachel Lindsay, who was now married with children.

In 1933, she died by suicide, overdosing on sleeping pills. Lindsay had died by suicide two years earlier. She is interred in Bellefontaine Cemetery in St. Louis.

Teasdale's suicide and "I Shall Not Care" 
A common urban legend surrounds Teasdale's suicide.  The poem "I Shall Not Care" was speculated to be her suicide note because of its depressing undertone.  The legend claims that her poem "I Shall Not Care" (which features themes of abandonment, bitterness, and contemplation of death) was penned as a suicide note to a former lover. However, the poem was actually first published in her 1915 collection Rivers to the Sea, a full 18 years before her suicide:

I Shall Not Care
WHEN I am dead and over me bright April
Shakes out her rain-drenched hair,
Tho' you should lean above me broken-hearted,
I shall not care.

I shall have peace, as leafy trees are peaceful
When rain bends down the bough,
And I shall be more silent and cold-hearted
Than you are now.

Legacy and influence

 The poem "There Will Come Soft Rains" from her 1920 collection Flame and Shadow inspired and is featured in a famous short story of the same name by Ray Bradbury.
 Teasdale is the favorite poet of Arlington LeGrande, the main character of Jacquelyn Mitchard's novel The Most Wanted.
 Teasdale's poems "The New Moon", "Only in Sleep" and "Stars" were set as choral pieces by Ēriks Ešenvalds, a Latvian composer, for Musica Baltica. "Stars" has become widely known for its use of crystal glasses for a soothing sound of the 'stars'.
"I Shall Not Care" from the 1915 Collected Poems appeared in the 1966 young adult novel Up a Road Slowly by Irene Hunt.
She was a major influence on academic Marion Cummings.
Composer Amy Aldrich Worth (1888-1967) set Teasdale's poem "Pierrot's Song" to music.
Composer Amy Beach (1867-1944) set Teasdale's poem "Dusk in June" to music.
In 1932, composer Mildred Lund Tyson set Teasdale's poem "Like Barley Bending" to music.
In 1937, the poet Orrick Glenday Johns wrote of her passing in his book, "Time of Our Lives: The Story of My Father and Myself".
 In 1967 Tom Rapp and the group Pearls Before Swine recorded a musical rendition of "I Shall Not Care" on their first album One Nation Underground.
 In 1994, she was inducted into the St. Louis Walk of Fame.
 Teasdale's poem "There Will Be Rest" has been set to music under multiple titles by different choral composers. In 2004, Craig Hella Johnson and Frank Ticheli composed "There Will Be Rest" for the Conspirare choral ensemble. Victor C. Johnson composed "Stars I Shall Find" in 2008.  In 2017, Z. Randall Stroope composed "And Sure Stars Shining"; additionally, Elaine Hagenberg composed "The Music of Stillness" that same year.
 In 2008, "There Will Come Soft Rains" was included in Fallout 3 alongside Ray Bradbury's short story of the same name. The poem is recited by a robot who has survived the nuclear apocalypse.
 In 2010, Teasdale's works were for the first time published in Italy, translated by Silvio Raffo.
 In 2003, American composer Timothy Hoekman set Teasdale's poem "Pierrot's Song" in his song cycle Serenade for tenor and piano.
In 2006, American composer Phyllis Zimmerman composed "Four Settings of Poems by Sara Teasdale" for choir, which was recorded on CD.
 In 2011, English composer Joseph Phibbs chose poems by Teasdale for his song-cycle From Shore to Shore, and the song "Pierrot", and in 2013-14 he returned to her texts for his six Moon Songs. He has also acknowledged her influence in his orchestral work Rivers to the Sea.
 In 1928 and 1931, respectively, Teasdale's poems "May Night" and "Dusk in June" were set to music by composer Marion Rogers Hickman.
 The Irish musician Tony Wright used the poem "There Will Come Soft Rains" as lyrics for a song of the same name. It was released as part of a double A side charity single for Help Musicians UK.
 In 2018, composer Hans Bridger Heruth set Teasdale's poem "Joy" to music in a piece commissioned by Dustin Cates and the Heartland Men's Chorus.
 In 2019, composer James McCarthy set several poems of Teasdale’s to music for his work “Codebreaker: The Alan Turing Story,” including “Deep in the Night,” “Enough,” “At Sea,” “If Death is Kind,” and “There Will Come Soft Rains.” 

 In 2022, composer Christopher Tin set several of Teasdale's poems to music as part of his album The Lost Birds.

Works 
 Sonnets to Duse and Other Poems (1907)
 Helen of Troy and Other Poems (1911)
 In the Train (1915)
 Rivers to the Sea (1915)
 Love Songs (1917)
 Flame and Shadow (1920)
 Dark of the Moon (1926)
 Stars To-night (1930)
 Strange Victory (1933)

References

Translations 

 Llegarán suaves lluvias. Antología bilingüe. Edición y traducción de Juan Carlos Villavicencio, con prólogo de Luz María Astudillo y epílogo de Kurt Folch. Descontexto Editores, Santiago de Chile, 2018. 
 Тисдейл С. Реки, текущие к морю: Избранные стихотворения (in Russian). – Moscow: 2011. – 192 pages.

External links 

 
 
 
 
 Sara Teasdale Collection at the Harry Ransom Center
 Our Poets of Today by Howard Willard Cook (1918 book) (Internet Archive copy)
 Modern American poetry by Louis Untermeyer (1921 book) (Internet Archive copy). She wrote over 600 poems.
 
 Complete Poetical Works of Sara Teasdale (Delphi Classics)
 Sara Teasdale: Profile and Poems at Poets.org
 Sara Teasdale Collection. Yale Collection of American Literature, Beinecke Rare Book and Manuscript Library.
 Musical works to texts by Sara Teasdale at the International Music Score Library Project

1884 births
1933 deaths
1933 suicides
20th-century American poets
American women poets
Pulitzer Prize for Poetry winners
Poets from Missouri
Writers from St. Louis
Drug-related suicides in Missouri
Burials at Bellefontaine Cemetery
20th-century American women writers
People from the Upper West Side